The 1834 Jerusalem earthquake occurred on 13 May during the first few days of the Peasants' revolt in Palestine against Ibrahim Pasha of Egypt. The earthquake's epicenter was in the Jerusalem area. After a brief lull, fighting resumed the next day.

Damage from the quake included the collapse of part of the city wall near the Dome of the Rock, the collapse of the dome over the Chapel of the Ascension, a minaret in the city and one on the Mount of Olives, the collapse or damage of several large Jerusalem homes, and the severe damage of Latin and Armenian monasteries in Bethlehem. The Church of the Holy Sepulchre suffered minor damage.

Bibliography

References

Earthquakes in the Levant
19th century in Jerusalem
Jerusalem
Peasants' revolt in Palestine
Jerusalem earthquake
Natural disasters in Ottoman Syria
May 1834 events
1834 disasters in the Ottoman Empire